Cloud was a browser-based operating system created by Good OS LLC, a Los Angeles-based corporation.  The company initially launched a Linux distribution called gOS which is  heavily based on Ubuntu, now in its third incarnation.

Overview 
The Cloud was a simplified operating system that ran just a web browser, providing access to a variety of web-based applications that allowed the user to perform many simple tasks without booting a full-scale operating system. Because of its simplicity, Cloud could boot in just a few seconds. The operating system is designed for Netbooks, Mobile Internet Devices, and PCs that are mainly used to browse the Internet. From Cloud the user can quickly boot into the main OS, because Cloud continues booting the main OS in the background.

Combining a browser with a basic operating system allows the use of cloud computing, in which applications and data "live and run" on the Internet instead of the hard drive.

Cloud can be installed and used together with other operating systems, or act as a standalone operating system. When used as a standalone operating system, hardware requirements are relatively low.

In 2009, Cloud was only officially available built into the GIGABYTE M912 Touch Screen Netbook.

Early reviews compared the operating system's user interface to OS X and noted the similarity of its browser to Google Chrome, although it is actually based on a modified Mozilla Firefox browser

See also 
 ChromeOS
 Mozilla Firefox
 EasyPeasy
 Joli OS
 EyeOS

References

External links 

 Netbooks running new 'Cloud OS' rumored for CES
 Good OS introduce quick boot Cloud OS for netbooks 

Cloud applications
Distributed data storage